In computing, the Common Public License (CPL) is a free software / open-source software license published by IBM. The Free Software Foundation and Open Source Initiative have approved the license terms of the CPL.

Definition
The CPL has the stated aims of supporting and encouraging collaborative open-source development while still retaining the ability to use the CPL'd content with software licensed under other licenses, including many proprietary licenses. The Eclipse Public License (EPL) consists of a slightly modified version of the CPL.

The CPL has some terms that resemble those of the GNU General Public License (GPL), but some key differences exist. A similarity relates to distribution of a modified computer program: under either license (CPL or GPL), one must make the source code of a modified program available to others.

CPL, like the GNU Lesser General Public License, allows non-CPL-licensed software to link to a library under CPL without requiring the linked source code to be made available to the licensee.

CPL lacks compatibility with both versions of the GPL because it has a "choice of law" section in section 7, which restricts legal disputes to a certain court.  Another source of incompatibility is the differing copyleft requirements.

To reduce the number of open source licenses, IBM and Eclipse Foundation agreed upon using solely the Eclipse Public License in the future. Open Source Initiative therefore lists the Common Public License as deprecated and superseded by EPL.

Projects using the Common Public License
 Microsoft has released its Windows Installer XML (WiX) developer tool, Windows Template Library (WTL) and the FlexWiki engine under the CPL as SourceForge projects.
 Some projects of the COIN-OR Foundation use the CPL.

See also

 Software license
 Software using the CPL (category)

References

External links
 Open Source Initiative The CPL License
 The CPL License from IBM
 The COIN-OR web page

IBM
Free and open-source software licenses
Copyleft software licenses

de:Eclipse Public License